Vijayalakshmi is a 1946 Indian Tamil language film directed by P. Pullaiah. The film stars B. R. Panthulu and M. V. Rajamma.

Plot 
The story revolves around a man's greed for money, the exploitation and ill-treatment of women, (with the complicity of his wife) and his scant respect for the rights or feelings of women in general. The demonetisation of 500, 1000 and 10,000 rupee notes by the government of the day leads to the climax of the story.

Cast 

 B. R. Panthulu
 M. V. Rajamma as Vijayalakshmi 
 T. R. Ramachandran
 M. J. Andal
 S. V. Subbaiah
 Sowdhamini

Production 
Vijayalakshmi is based on the Marathi stage play Bandaachi Soon by Ganesh Krishna Shastri Pathak.

Soundtrack 
Music was scored by G. Govindarajulu Naidu.

Reception 
The film did not succeed commercially.

References 

1946 films
1940s Tamil-language films
Indian black-and-white films
Indian films based on plays